Charles Herbert Kingsley (6 March 1899 – 9 January 1996) was an amateur English tennis player. He won the Scottish Championships singles title in 1924. He reached the quarterfinals of Wimbledon and the final of Monte Carlo in 1926.

References

External links

English male tennis players
British male tennis players
1899 births
1996 deaths
People from Mawlamyine